"Behind the Tear" is a 1965 single by Sonny James.  The single was Sonny James's third number one on the U.S. country music chart. "Behind the Tear" spent three non-consecutive weeks at number one and a total of twenty weeks on the country chart.

Chart performance

References

Sonny James songs
1965 singles
Capitol Records singles
1965 songs
Songs written by Ned Miller